Quail Hawkins (born Helena Ann Hawkins) was born on March 29, 1905 in Spokane, Washington.  She was an American bookseller and writer of children's literature. She died on August 16, 2002, in Pacific Grove, California.

Biography 
Hawkins was the oldest of 7 children. Her father was a fruit wholesaler and her mother a columnist for a local newspaper, The Spokane Register. Hawkins attended the University of California at Berkeley in 1927, she did not complete with a degree. She became a bookseller during the 1920s, ending up at Sather Gate Bookshop in 1931. Sather Gate is a supplier of books for schools and libraries. She worked there until 1972. She also worked for Publishers Weekly and the University of California Press.  She contributed to the 1963 Encyclopædia Britannica children's literature.  According to a memoir, Hawkins once hired author Beverly Cleary to work at Sather Gate Bookshop for the holiday rush.

Works 
At the time of her death, none of her books remained in print.
 Quetzal Quest: The Story of the Capture of the Quetzal, the Sacred Bird of the Aztecs and the Mayas, with V. W. von Hagen, Harcourt, 1939.
 The Treasure of the Tortoise Islands, with V. W. von Hagen, Harcourt, 1940.
 Prayers and Graces for Little Children, Grosset, 1941, revised edition published as A Little Book of Prayers and Graces, Doubleday, 1952.
 Who Wants an Apple?, Holiday, 1942.
 A Puppy for Keeps, Holiday, 1943.
 Don't Run, Apple!, Holiday, 1944.
 Too Many Dogs, Holiday, 1946.
 Mark, Mark, Shut the Door, Holiday, 1947.
 The Best Birthday, Doubleday, 1954.
 Mountain Courage, Doubleday, 1957.
 The Aunt-Sitter, Holiday, 1958.
 Androcles and the Lion (retold), Coward, 1970.
 The Art of Bookselling: Quail Hawkins and the Sather Gate Book Shop: An Interview Conducted in 1978, Regional Oral History Office, with Marsha Maguire, Bancroft Library, University of California, 1979.

References

External links 

Quail Hawkins papers, 1925-1974: includes published works, book length manuscripts, short stories, musicals, articles, poetry, clippings, and correspondence.

American children's writers
1905 births
2002 deaths
Writers from Spokane, Washington
20th-century American writers
American booksellers
20th-century American women writers